Julianne Holt-Lunstad is a psychologist at Brigham Young University. She is a fellow of the Society of Experimental Social Psychology and Association for Psychological Science.

Research
Holt-Lunstad specializes in psychology and neuroscience. Her research focuses on the long-term health effects of social connections and includes a meta-analysis on the effects of loneliness and social isolation on mortality. That research has linked loneliness to deteriorating health.

Holt-Lunstad was the first US-based researcher to publish studies connecting poor social support to morbidity.

As a result of her in-depth research, Holt-Lunstad was selected to serve as a scientific advisor for the Australian Coalition to End Loneliness in 2017. She has also been called to testify in front of the United States Congress Special Committee on Aging regarding her research.

In 2018, Holt-Lunstad was awarded BYU's Karl G. Maeser Research & Creative Arts Award. She is also a fellow of the Society of Experimental Social Psychology and the Association for Psychological Science.

References

Living people
Brigham Young University faculty
American women psychologists
21st-century American psychologists
American women neuroscientists
American neuroscientists
Year of birth missing (living people)